JoJo's Bizarre Adventure: Crazy Diamond's Demonic Heartbreak is a manga series written by Kouhei Kadono and drawn by Tasuku Karasuma. It is a spin-off from Hirohiko Araki's manga JoJo's Bizarre Adventure, narratively set between its third and fourth parts. It is serialized by Shueisha in their monthly magazine Ultra Jump since December 18, 2021, and is also published in collected tankōbon volumes.

Plot

Crazy Diamond's Demonic Heartbreak is a spin-off from Hirohiko Araki's JoJo's Bizarre Adventure, and is set in March 1999, a decade after the events of Stardust Crusaders and a month before the events of Diamond Is Unbreakable. Ten years after Dio's death, Hol Horse is among those who survived Dio and attempt to resume their normal lives. One day, Hol Horse accepts a request from the mother of Pet Shop's original owner to find her son's other pet, a parrot named Petsounds who also possesses a Stand. Following a encounter with Mariah, Hol Horse enlists Boingo to aid him with the latter's Stand Tohth with the two traveling to Morioh.  There, the two encounter high school freshman Josuke Higashikata and Ryoko Kakyoin, Noriaki Kakyoin's cousin who blamed herself for causing the events that brought her cousin to Dio. Eventually, it is revealed that Petsounds was being used by the grandson of a surviving member of the vampires that the Pillar Man Kars created in the 1930s who seeks to realize his grandfather's vision.

Characters
 is a former servant of Dio who fought against Jotaro Kujo and his allies in 1988. Ten years after Dio's defeat, he is tasked with finding and returning Petsounds to its rightful owner. Hol Horse wields the Stand Emperor, a long range Stand resembling a gun that can steer the bullets it fires.
Josuke Higashikata is the illegitimate son of Joseph Joestar. He is a freshman who lives in the town of Morioh with his mother and grandfather. After meeting Hol Horse, Josuke decides to involve himself in the gunslinger's mission. His Stand is Crazy Diamond, which can restore objects to their original state or rearrange their structure, allowing him to heal injuries or revert complex structures to their raw components.
Ryoko Kakyoin is the younger cousin of the late Noriaki Kakyoin. Still seeking answers about her cousin's death, Ryoko is soon caught up in the conflict between Hol Horse and Petsounds. She gains the power of Thoth after Boingo abandons the Stand, which she hopes will lead her to the answers she seeks.
Boingo is an insecure young man living with his older brother. Hol Horse enlists him to help in tracking down and capturing Petsounds. His Stand is Thoth, a comic book that depicts unavoidable predictions of the near future. Soon after arriving in Japan, Boingo parts ways with the book, which falls into Ryoko's hands.
Petsounds is a parrot trained alongside Pet Shop from Stardust Crusaders. After killing their trainer, Dio adopted the two birds as subordinates. Ten years after Dio's death, Petsounds is suddenly stolen from its trainer's grandmother and brought to Morioh, where it is allowed to wreak havoc. Petsounds's unnamed Stand can replay any event that it has witnessed, forcing its victims to relive the actions and feelings of the roles they are forced into.
Kazuki Karaiya is a police officer in the town of Morioh. He is a partial vampire as a result of inheriting power from his grandfather, who served in the German army and became a vampire during the events of Battle Tendency. He steals Petsounds from its owner in Egypt in order to fulfill his ambitions of gaining complete power over others. Karaiya is not a Stand user himself, but can control Petsounds and its Stand after having the parrot swallow part of his earlobe.
Koji Kiyohara is a university student who takes pleasure in killing innocent animals with a crossbow. Karaiya, noticing his twisted personality, manipulates him into working alongside Petsounds to attack the officer's enemies.

Production and release
Crazy Diamond's Demonic Heartbreak is written by Kouhei Kadono and drawn by Tasuku Karasuma, and is the second JoJo's Bizarre Adventure spin-off manga after Araki's Thus Spoke Rohan Kishibe. The manga is serialized by Shueisha in their monthly magazine Ultra Jump since December 18, 2021, in the magazine's January 2022 issue. Shueisha also publishes the series in collected tankōbon volumes since June 17, 2022. It is planned to be released in French by  starting in 2023 or 2024.

Volumes

Reception
Volume 1 of the series debuted with an estimated 35,000 copies sold, as the seventeenth highest selling comic of the week on the Japanese Oricon sales charts, with an additional 38,000 copies in its second week. The second volume debuted higher, at ninth place with 54,000 copies sold. By December 2022, Shueisha reported that the series had reached 300,000 copies in circulation, including digital sales.

Notes

References

External links
  

Comics spin-offs
Fiction set in 1999
JoJo's Bizarre Adventure
Seinen manga
Shueisha manga